Croatian Popular Party is a right-wing political party in Croatia.

The party was founded in 1997 by Tomislav Merčep after his departure from Croatian Democratic Union.

Merčep was the party candidate in the 2000 Croatian presidential election, and was eliminated in the first round as the seventh of nine candidates, winning 22,672 votes or 0.85% of the vote.

Tomislav Petrak (born 1946), a Ph.D. in veterinary science a professor at the Faculty of Food Technology and Biotechnology in Zagreb, member of the Party since its founding in 1997, was its candidate in the 2005 Croatian presidential election.

Electoral history

Legislative

Presidential

References

Conservative parties in Croatia
Political parties established in 1997